Andrei Kushnir (born August 30, 1947, Regensburg, Germany) is an American fine art painter. He is known for his landscapes, city views, and seascapes, but also has created genre, portraits and still life works. He is a resident of Maryland, with a studio in Washington, D.C.

Biography and career 
Andrei Kushnir was born in Regensburg, Germany, the son of Ukrainian parents who immigrated to the United States to escape Soviet communism.
He began painting in oils in 1980 and quickly progressed to painting landscapes on site.  While essentially self-taught, Kushnir studied with artists Michael Francis and Michele Martin Taylor.  He developed his own naturalistic realist style, and has worked primarily outdoors, in every season and type of weather.

In the 1980s, his works were shown in Washington, D.C. area exhibits. In the 1990s, Kushnir began showing his work nationally. He was elected a Signature Member of the National Oil and Acrylic Painters Society, a member of the Salmagundi Club, NYC, the Washington Society of Landscape Painters, and was elected a juried Official U.S. Coast Guard Artist. Andrei Kushnir's works were shown in competitive exhibitions throughout the United States.

During the early 21st century, Andrei Kushnir established and operated, with artist Michele Martin Taylor, art galleries in Manhattan, New York, and Ellicott City, Maryland, where they exhibited their own works and works of other mid-career American artists. In 2006, Andrei Kushnir opened a studio and gallery in Washington, D.C., where he exhibited his works and those of other American artists with whom he has personally painted. The landscape painter Alexangel Estevez "studied with Andrei Kushnir.
   

Andrei Kushnir promoted the scenic beauties of the Potomac River throughout his career as an artist. He was the founder of the Potomac River School artists, organizing exhibits for the group at the Sandy Spring Museum, Sandy Spring, Maryland, the American University Library and the American Painting Fine Art gallery, the latter two in Washington, D.C. The Sandy Spring Museum in Sandy Spring, Maryland co-published an illustrated catalog about Kushnir's group of Potomac River painters. Andrei Kushnir also devoted two of his own exhibitions of paintings to the Potomac River, "My River" and "River Visions." His painting "Potomac Riverscape," received the Juror's Choice Award at the 1st Biennial Maryland Regional Juried Art Exhibition, presented by University of Maryland University College, 2011.

The artist worked from 2004 to 2015 painting en plein air landscapes throughout the Shenandoah Valley, Virginia, including subjects of historical, cultural as well as scenic importance. The culmination of this project is the publication of Oh, Shenandoah, George F. Thompson Publishing, Staunton, Virginia, December 2016. The book contains 263 of the author's original paintings of the historic Shenandoah Valley and River. Seventy-one of these paintings were exhibited from April 1 through September 11, 2016 at the Museum of the Shenandoah Valley, Winchester, Virginia. This book received favorable reviews, especially for the authenticity of its presentation of the Shenandoah Valley and its people. An exhibition of 150 of the paintings from Oh, Shenandoah was held at the James Madison University Duke Gallery of Fine Art, Harrisonburg, Virginia, in May/June 2017.
An exhibition titled "Oh, Shenandoah: Landscapes of Diversity" of 52 of the paintings from Oh, Shenandoah was held from December 2018 to September 2019 at the Virginia Museum of History and Culture, Richmond, Virginia, and a traveling version of this exhibit was organized by the Museum.

Publications 

Other publications devoted to the artistic works of Andrei Kushnir include the C&O Canal, Potomac River, Shenandoah Valley, Blue Ridge Mountains and Marine scenes as subjects. The artist's non-fiction account of his father's life and times was published in 2020.

Collections 

The artist's works are in the permanent collections of the U.S. Coast Guard, District of Columbia's Commission of Arts & Humanities, University of Maryland University College, Maryland, Museum of Florida's Art and Culture, Avon Park, Florida, Virginia Historical Society, Richmond, Virginia, The University Club, Washington, D.C. and Presidents of the United States and Ukraine.

Recognition 

 
 Kushnir has been labeled a "true plein air artist." He is known for his ability to capture "a sense of place."
 A Washington D.C. art critic has stated: "Andrei Kushnir's eye has been his teacher" and "[p]ure landscape painters like Andrei Kushnir…reach back to the way the earth was once and hold it dear."
 Andrei Kushnir was the first living artist selected for a single artist exhibition at the Virginia Historical Society (VHS).
 The VHS published a special monograph for this exhibit, with essay by Lora Robins Curator of Art, William M.S. Rasmussen.
 The United States agency Voice of America, produced a video news feature about the artist and this exhibition and broadcast it to Ukraine and other European countries in 2004.
 In 2008, Kushnir's portrait paintings of important Ukrainian Americans were included in an exhibit of persons of Ukrainian descent important in world history at the Ukraine House, in Kyiv, Ukraine.
 Andrei Kushnir was featured in publications of the Nature Conservancy related to the role of the artist in the protection and enjoyment of natural resources.

External links 
 Andrei Kushnir's website:
 Salmagundi Club website
 Washington Society of Landscape Painters website

References 

1947 births
People from Regensburg
German people of Ukrainian descent
German emigrants to the United States
Living people
20th-century American painters
American male painters
21st-century American painters
21st-century American male artists
American people of Ukrainian descent
Artists from Washington, D.C.
Painters from Washington, D.C.
Painters from Maryland
20th-century American male artists